Berbara (Aakkar)    is a village in Akkar Governorate, Lebanon.

The population  is mostly Alawite.

History
In 1838, Eli Smith noted  the village as Burbarah,  located east of esh-Sheikh Mohammed. The  inhabitants were Alawites.

References

Bibliography

External links
Berbara (Aakkar), Localiban 

Populated places in Akkar District